Otitoma boucheti is a species of sea snail, a marine gastropod mollusk in the family Pseudomelatomidae, the turrids and allies.

Description
The length of the shell attains 15 mm.

Distribution
This marine species occurs off the Fiji Islands.

References

 Morassi M., Nappo A. & Bonfitto A. (2017). New species of the genus Otitoma Jousseaume, 1898 (Pseudomelatomidae, Conoidea) from the Western Pacific Ocean. European Journal of Taxonomy. 304: 1-30

External links
 Gastropods.com: Otitoma boucheti

boucheti
Gastropods described in 2017